Black Point is a cape on the Pacific Coast of northern California in the United States.

Background

The Sonoma County Regional Parks Department maintains a coastal access trail, parking area, and restrooms, located just off State Route 1 near milepost 50.8.

Black Point Beach, located just east of the point, is a surfing location featuring heavy swell that sometimes gets hollow.

See also
List of Sonoma County Regional Parks facilities
Salt Point State Park
Black Point Beach

References

Headlands of California
Landforms of Sonoma County, California
Surfing locations in California